Hasna Hena Akhee Achol, known by her stage name Achol is a Bangladeshi film actress who appears in Dhallywood films. She made her debut in the film Bhool, released in 2011. After making the appearance in the 2013 romantic film Jotil Prem, Achol's early years in the film industry have been successful.

Filmography

Web series

References

External links
 

Living people
21st-century Bangladeshi actresses
Bangladeshi film actresses
People from Khulna
People from Khulna District
1992 births